Agona-Akrofoso, sometimes called Akrofonso, is a town in the Sekyere South District in the Ashanti Region of Ghana, approximately  north-east of the Ashanti Regional capital, Kumasi, and about two miles east of Agona, the district capital.

Agona-Akrofoso lies off the Kumasi-Mampong highway. The population is estimated to be about 1,600 inhabitants. It is at Latitude 6°55'15.045"N and Longitude 1°28'11.9634"W.

People
The residents are primarily Ashantis, belonging to the Akan people and speaking the Twi language, although the language of business, commerce and education is English, as in all of Ghana.

Since the 1980s the population has increased and housing has expanded beyond the historic core.

Infrastructure 
Agona-Akrofoso is on the Ghana National Electricity Grid, and many homes have electricity.

There are several public wells where water is available for a fee (per bucket), although many homes have private wells.

Agona-Akrofoso had a soccer club, the Multi Stars, which once played in the third division of the Ghanaian league hierarchy but has become dormant.

Education 
The local government runs a kindergarten in Agona-Akrofoso that is not always fully attended by all eligible children. Reasons for poor attendance include poor health, parents' inability to provide supplies such as shoes, and the need for children to remain at home to help their parents. In addition, there is a primary and middle school called Junior High School. The school's buildings were built in 1942, and was later upgraded. Graduates of the
junior high school typically attend high school in Sekyere South District, although many leave the area entirely to attend school in Kumasi, Accra, or other larger cities.

Early in 2012, Akrofoso began developing plans to develop the town, focusing in part on the junior high school. Some long-delayed school improvements are needed. Future phases will address potable water needs, hand-washing stations and a new school fence.

In 2016, the community renovated the junior high school, fixing the roofs and painting the building.

Economy 
Cocoa production is the primary occupation, and yams, cassava, poultry, plantains, cocoyams, and fruit are also important to the local economy.

Government 
On 12 February 2021, Nana Owusu Achaw Brempong was reëlected Ashanti Region Representative to the Ghana Council of State, receiving 77 of the 86 votes cast.

Gallery

References

External links
 Facebook link for Agona-Akrofoso-Ashanti-Ghana

Education in Ghana
Populated places in the Ashanti Region